The Kerang–Koondrook Tramway was an Australian private railway of  broad gauge, running from the state-owned Victorian Railways network Piangil railway line at Kerang to the Murray River town of Koondrook, with intermediate stations at Yeoburn, Hinksons, Teal Point and Gannawarra.

The tramway was opened in 1889. On 31 December 1898, the now Kerang-based Shire of Swan Hill was renamed the Shire of Kerang. By 1920, the tramway's construction had cost £39,229.

In 1929, a four-wheel vertical boilered locomotive was imported to work the tramway, manufactured by the Sentinel Waggon Works in Shrewsbury. It was withdrawn in 1941 and scrapped in 1952. There is a description of a journey on the railway in 1938 in an article in the March 1971 edition of the Australian Railway Historical Society Bulletin.

Ownership of the tramway was transferred to the Victorian Railways on 1 February 1952. In its later years, passenger services on the line were run by a 102hp Walker railmotor, paid for by the Victorian Education Department, to convey school children. That service was withdrawn on 16 December 1976. A railfan farewell special, with a train hauled by T356, ran on 20 November 1977. The line was officially closed on 3 March 1981.

References

External links
 
 Images from the Koondrook Railway
 Image: Koondrook railway station
 Image: Replica locomotive along with QR open wagon, L sheep wagon and a ZL guards van

Defunct railway companies of Australia
Closed regional railway lines in Victoria (Australia)
Kerang, Victoria
Victorian Heritage Register
Victorian Heritage Register Loddon Mallee (region)
Shire of Gannawarra